The men's welterweight boxing competition at the 2013 Summer Universiade in Kazan was held between 5 July and 9 July.

Results

References
Draw

2013 Summer Universiade events